Murraytrema is a genus of monopisthocotylean monogeneans, belonging to the family Diplectanidae.  Species of this genus are parasitic on the gills of marine fish of the families Sciaenidae and Sparidae.

Species
According to the World Register of Marine Species, species in this genus include:
 Murraytrema bychowskyi Oliver, 1987 
 Murraytrema johniui Yao, Wang, Xia & Chen, 1998
 Murraytrema pricei Bychowsky & Nagibina, 1977
 Murraytrema robustum (Murray, 1931) Price, 1937 (type species)

References

Diplectanidae
Monogenea genera
Parasites of fish